The Asphalt Jungle is a 1950 American film noir heist film directed by John Huston. Based on the 1949 novel of the same name by W. R. Burnett, it tells the story of a jewel robbery in a Midwestern city. The film stars Sterling Hayden and  Louis Calhern, and features Jean Hagen, James Whitmore, Sam Jaffe, and John McIntire. Marilyn Monroe also appears, in one of her earliest roles.

The film was nominated for four Academy Awards. In 2008, The Asphalt Jungle was selected for preservation in the United States National Film Registry by the Library of Congress as being "culturally, historically, or aesthetically significant".

Plot
When criminal mastermind Erwin "Doc" Riedenschneider is released from prison after seven years, he visits a bookie named Cobby in an unnamed Midwestern river city. Doc needs $50,000 to hire three men—a safecracker, a driver, and a hooligan—to pull off a huge jewel robbery.  Cobby arranges a meeting between Doc and Alonzo Emmerich, a high-living society lawyer and known fixer. Doc tells Emmerich he estimates the theft will yield a cache worth half a million dollars or more. Emmerich agrees to front the money and find a fence. After they leave, Emmerich finds his young girlfriend Angela asleep on the couch.

Later Ememerich confesses he is broke to his private detective Bob Brannom.  Sent to collect debts owed Emmerich to raise money to pay for the stolen jewels, Brannom comes up empty.  Desperate, Emmerich inveigles the thug to help him double-cross the others, proposing a scheme for him to abscond with the gems.

Doc secures Louie Ciavelli as his "box man". Ciavelli only trusts Gus Minissi, a hunchbacked diner owner, to be the getaway driver. Last hired is chronically gambling-strapped tough Dix Handley, a hulking Kentucky hayseed known to Gus. Dix tells Doll Conovan—who is in love with him—of his dream to buy back the horse farm that his family lost after a terrible year that included his father's death and a prized colt breaking its leg.

To access the jewelry store, Ciavelli hammers through a brick wall, deactivates an alarm to admit Doc and Dix, and uses home-brewed nitroglycerine to blow open the safe. Things then begin to go drastically wrong. The concussion of the explosion triggers several burglar alarms in the area. The volatile Dix slugs a security guard on rounds. The guard drops his revolver, which goes off and wounds Ciavelli in the belly. The men get away unseen, but a police manhunt begins.

Ciavelli insists that Gus take him home. Gus's wife wants him taken to the hospital, where his critical gunshot wound will be recognized and reported.  Instead, Gus sends for a trusted but illicit doctor. 

Doc and Dix arrive at Emmerich's, but see through Emmerich's attempt to stall them.  Realizing this, Brannom draws a gun, but is killed by Dix, who receives a flesh wound in his side.  Doc scolds a morose Emmerich for his foolish plan and tells him to offer the loot to the jeweler's insurance company for 25% of its value since peddling it with the heat on is out of the question.

Emmerich dumps Brannom's body in the river. The police find the list of debtors on Emmerich's letterhead on the corpse. When they question him, Emmerich lies about his whereabouts and claims he spent the night with his mistress, Angela Phinlay.

Under pressure from police commissioner Hardy, police lieutenant Ditrich—a corrupt cop on Cobby's payroll—beats the bookie into confessing everything in a vain attempt to save himself from becoming ensnared.

Hardy then arrests Emmerich at Angela's home and threatens her with jail for providing Emmerich with an alibi. When the police allow Emmerich to leave the room to phone his invalid wife, he shoots himself dead.

After Gus is arrested, he attacks Cobby in the jail, warning him that he will end up in the morgue. When the police knock on Ciavelli's door, they find his funeral in progress.

In Doll's apartment, Doc offers Dix some of the stones but he refuses; he just wants to go back home to Kentucky. Doll then gets Dix a car and insists on going along.

Doc persuades a taxi driver to drive him to Cleveland, a multi-hour ride. They stop first at a roadside diner, where Doc becomes entranced by a pretty young woman dancing to jukebox tunes. Because of the delay, a lustfully oblivious Doc is recognized by two policemen, who arrest him after finding the stolen jewels hidden in his overcoat.

Suffering from blood loss, Dix passes out at the wheel. He's taken to a doctor, who phones the local police to report a gunshot wound. Dix regains consciousness, pulls out an IV and escapes. 

At a press conference, Hardy notes that 3 of the 7 suspects have died, 3 others have been arrested, and the one on the loose is a hardened killer "without human feeling."

Back at the wheel, the rolling green fields of Bluegrass country pass as Dix deliriously rambles about the sprightly colt he loved as a boy. Arriving at his childhood pasture he stumbles in and collapses. Doll runs for help, while horses gather to nuzzle the expiring man.

Cast

 Sterling Hayden as Dix Handley
 Louis Calhern as Alonzo D. Emmerich
 Jean Hagen as "Doll" Conovan
 James Whitmore as Gus Minissi
 Sam Jaffe as "Doc" Erwin Riedenschneider
 John McIntire as Police Commissioner Hardy
 Marc Lawrence as Cobby
 Barry Kelley as Lt. Ditrich

 Anthony Caruso as Louis Ciavelli
 Teresa Celli as Maria Ciavelli
 Marilyn Monroe as Angela Phinlay
 William "Wee Willie" Davis as Timmons
 Dorothy Tree as May Emmerich
 Brad Dexter as Bob Brannom
 John Maxwell as Dr. Swanson

Uncredited:
 Alex Gerry as Maxwell
 Tom Browne Henry as James X. Connery
 Don Haggerty as detective Andrews
 James Seay as detective Janocek
 Henry Rowland as Franz Schurz, German taxi driver
 Helene Stanley as Jeannie
 Strother Martin as man in police lineup
 Henry Corden as man in police lineup

Source:

Production
The film was an adaptation by director John Huston and screenwriter Ben Maddow of the 1949 novel by crime writer W. R. Burnett. It was backed by the major film studio Metro-Goldwyn-Mayer, where it was green-lighted by production chief Dore Schary, over the objections of studio head Louis B. Mayer.  From the publication of Burnett's first novel, Little Caesar in 1929, Burnett had a strong track record of books that were adapted into films shortly after publication.  Huston and Ben Maddow wrote the adaptation, which emphasized the crooks' story and reduced the police procedural aspect. Burnett was consulted as the shooting script was being written, and he approved the final version. The studio allowed the production a relatively free hand.

Production on The Asphalt Jungle took place from October 21, 1949, to late December of that year. Location shooting took place in Lexington and Keeneland, Kentucky and in Cincinnati, Ohio.

In shooting the film, Huston was influenced by European neorealist films such as Open City (1945) and Bicycle Thieves (1948). He combined the naturalism of that genre with the stylized look of film noir and Hollywood crime films.  When the film was complete, Louis B. Mayer said: "It's trash. That Asphalt Pavement thing is full of nasty, ugly people doing nasty things. I wouldn't cross the street to see a picture like that."

The Production Code Administration's main concerns with the script were the detailed depiction of the heist and the fact that the character of the corrupt lawyer Emmerich seemed to cheat justice by killing himself. Neither the studio nor the censors interfered significantly with the script, however, and both the heist and the suicide featured in the final cut.  The latter scene was re-written: the original had Emmerich finishing a suicide note, while the revision has him stall after writing an endearing salutation to his wife, crumple the note, and become visibly extremely agitated about the decision to kill himself before an abrupt cutaway to an offscreen shot being heard.

Huston's first choice for the role played by Marilyn Monroe was Lola Albright, who was not available. Huston brought in Monroe for a screen test, and rehearsed for it with her in his office.  He wasn't convinced that she was right for the part, and dismissed her, but changed his mind when he watched her leave the room.  According to film noir authority Eddie Muller, Huston later said that Monroe was "one of the few actresses who could make an entrance by leaving the room."  The role was a breakout for her.

Both Huston and star Sterling Hayden, a World War II hero who had fought alongside Yugoslav Partisans and had joined the American Communist Party upon returning to the U.S., were members of the Committee for the First Amendment, which opposed the blacklisting of alleged communists active in the film industry during the Red Scare.

Reception

Box office
According to MGM records the film made $1,077,000 in the US and Canada and $1,060,000 overseas resulting in a profit of only $40,000.

Critical response
A contemporary review in Photoplay stated:

At the time of its release The New York Times said of the film:

In 1988 the Criterion Collection critic Peter Heath Becker admired Huston's technique:

On today's review aggregation website Rotten Tomatoes the film has an approval rating of 97% based on 35 reviews, with an average rating of 8.4/10. The site's critical consensus reads, "The Asphalt Jungle is an expertly told crime story with attention paid to the crime and characters in equal measure."

Awards and honors

Legacy
Over time The Asphalt Jungle has become to be regarded as one of the more influential crime films of the 1950s.  According to the AFI Film Catalog, "is widely regarded by film critics as one of John Huston's best."

The film spawned a television series, The Asphalt Jungle, starring Jack Warden, Arch Johnson, and William Smith, which ran for thirteen episodes in the spring and summer of 1961 on ABC. The series, though, resembled the film in name only, except for one episode, "The Professor", which was constructed as a sequel to the feature. Beyond this, none of the characters in the film appeared in the television scripts, and the plots were devoted to the exploits of the major case squad of the New York Police Department. One of the most notable features of the series is the theme song, written by Duke Ellington.

Burnett's novel The Asphalt Jungle was the basis of M-G-M's western film The Badlanders (1958) directed by Delmer Daves, as well as Cairo starring George Sanders, followed by the blaxploitation film Cool Breeze (1972), directed by Barry Pollack.

The Asphalt Jungle further developed the crime thriller subgenre of caper films. The 1955 French film Rififi, which critics such as Leonard Maltin have labeled as the best heist film ever, drew much inspiration from The Asphalt Jungle.

In 2008, The Asphalt Jungle was selected for preservation in the United States National Film Registry by the Library of Congress as being "culturally, historically, or aesthetically significant".

Colorization dispute
The movie was the subject of a film colorization lawsuit and controversy in France. Turner Entertainment entered into an agreement with the French television channel, La Cinq, to broadcast the colorized movie. John Huston's heirs objected, filing a lawsuit against broadcasting this version. On November 23, 1988, The Asphalt Jungle was prohibited from being broadcast in France. On July 6, 1989, La Cinq won on appeal, broadcasting the film on August 6, 1989. Finally in Turner Entertainment Co. v. Huston, on May 28, 1991, the Court of Cassation cancelled the judgment delivered on July 6, 1989, stating that colorizing the movie transformed the original artwork enough to potentially transgress the author's moral rights.

References

External links

 
 
 
  (includes detailed film synopsis and film clip)
 
 The Asphalt Jungle at Film Noir of the Week by film historian William Hare
 The Asphalt Jungle: “A Left-Handed Form of Human Endeavor” an essay by Geoffrey O’Brien at the Criterion Collection
 
 The Asphalt Jungle essay by Daniel Eagan in America's Film Legacy: The Authoritative Guide to the Landmark Movies in the National Film Registry, A&C Black, 2010 , pp. 437–438

1950 films
1950 crime films
1950s heist films
American crime thriller films
American black-and-white films
American heist films
Edgar Award-winning works
1950s English-language films
Film noir
Films based on American novels
Films set in Ohio
Films shot in Kentucky
Films shot in Ohio
Films based on crime novels
Films based on works by W. R. Burnett
Films directed by John Huston
Films scored by Miklós Rózsa
Metro-Goldwyn-Mayer films
Films with screenplays by John Huston
United States National Film Registry films
1950s American films